The speedy leaf-toed gecko (Hemidactylus citernii) is a species of lizard in the family Gekkonidae. The species is native to East Africa and the Horn of Africa.

Etymology
The specific name, citernii, is in honor of Italian explorer Carlo Citerni.

Geographic range
H. citernii is found in Djibouti and northwestern Somalia, and possibly also in Kenya.

Habitat

Reproduction
H. citernii is oviparous.

References

Further reading
Boulenger GA (1912). "Missione per la Frontiera Italo-Etiopica sotto il commando del Capitano Carlo Citerni. Resulti zoologici. List of the Reptiles and Batrachians". Annali del Museo Civico di Storia Naturale di Genova, Serie terza [Third Series] 5: 329–332. (Hemidactylus citernii, new species, pp. 329–330). (in English, except for some Italian in title). 
Lanza B (1990). "Amphibians and reptiles of the Somali Democratic Republic: checklist and biogeography". Biogeographia 14: 407–465. (Hemidactylus citernii, p. 414).
Parker HW (1942). "The Lizards of British Somaliland". Bulletin of the Museum of Comparative Zoölogy at Harvard College 91: 1–101. (Hemidactylus citernii, p. 30).
Rösler H (2000). "Kommentierte Liste der rezent, subrezent und fossil bekannten Geckotaxa (Reptilia: Gekkonomorpha)". Gekkota 2: 28–153. (Hemidactylus citernii, p. 85). (in German).

Hemidactylus
Geckos of Africa
Fauna of Djibouti
Reptiles of Somalia
Reptiles described in 1912
Taxa named by George Albert Boulenger